The Anderson County Advocate was a local weekly newspaper for Garnett, Kansas with a circulation of about 2,000. The newspaper maintained an online presence.

References

External links
 
 Anderson County Advocate - archive of older website
 Obituaries from the Anderson County Advocate - archive of older website

Newspapers published in Kansas
Anderson County, Kansas
Weekly newspapers published in the United States